Wipf and Stock is a publisher in Eugene, Oregon, publishing works in theology, biblical studies, history and philosophy.

History
Wipf and Stock was established in 1995 following a joint venture between John Wipf of the Archives Bookshop in Pasadena, California, and Jon Stock of Windows Booksellers in Eugene, Oregon. The company publishes new works and reprints under the imprints Wipf & Stock, Cascade Books,  Pickwick Publications, Resource Publications, Slant, and Front Porch Republic Books.  Cascade Books is aimed at the general public, whereas Pickwick Publications caters to academics.

The publishing focus of Wipf & Stock is broad, with books in biblical studies, theology, ethics, church history, linguistics, history, classics, philosophy, preaching, and church ministry.

Publishing Model

Wipf and Stock has consolidated the publication process so that every aspect of production, from acquisitions and editing, to typesetting, printing, and binding happen in one location. It also employs short-run production methods. According to Wipf and Stock, this allows it to accept titles based on merit rather than on projected sales.

Journals Published
Wipf and Stock publishes Sehnsucht, a journal on the works of C. S. Lewis first published in 2007.

Book Retractions
In 2022, the Cascade imprint of Wipf and Stock retracted the book Bad and Boujee: Toward a Trap Feminist Theology.  The book was retired following complaints raised on social media.  Cascade apologised for the publication, lamenting the "inappropriateness of a White theologian writing about the experience of Black women."

References

External links
 
 Wipf and Stock editor blog

1995 establishments in Oregon
Book publishing companies based in Oregon
Companies based in Eugene, Oregon
Evangelical Christian publishing companies
Publishing companies established in 1995